The Ekstromer was an English electric car manufactured only in 1905.  Produced by a battery manufacturer, it came in a range of models, including a light two-seater which was said to have a 100-mile range.

See also
 List of car manufacturers of the United Kingdom

References

Defunct motor vehicle manufacturers of the United Kingdom